Nymphaea nouchali, often known by its synonym Nymphaea stellata, or by common names blue lotus, star lotus, red water lily, dwarf aquarium lily, blue water lily, blue star water lily or manel flower, is a water lily of genus Nymphaea. It is native to southern and eastern parts of Asia, and is the national flower of Bangladesh and  Sri Lanka. In Sanskrit, it is utpala. This species is usually considered to include the blue Egyptian lotus N. nouchali var. caerulea. In the past, taxonomic confusion has occurred, with the name Nymphaea nouchali incorrectly applied to Nymphaea pubescens.

Description

N. nouchali is a day-blooming non-viviparous plant with submerged roots and stems. Part of the leaves are submerged, while others rise slightly above the surface. The leaves are round and green on top; they usually have a darker underside. The floating leaves have undulating edges that give them a crenellated appearance. Their size is about 20–23 cm and their spread is up to 1.5 m from the rhizome.

This water lily has a beautiful flower which is usually white or blue in color. Its variants occur in white, blue,violet,purple,pink & cream/yellowish white colours.The flower has four or five sepals and 13-15 petals that have an angular appearance, making the flower look star-shaped from above. The cup-like calyx has a diameter of 4–15 cm.

The leaves of the lily can be affected by a water-born fungi, Doassansiopsis nymphaea.

Distribution and habitat

This aquatic plant is native in a broad region from Afghanistan, the Indian subcontinent, to Taiwan, southeast Asia and Australia. It has been long valued as a garden flower in Thailand and Myanmar to decorate ponds and gardens. In its natural state, N. nouchali is found in static or slow-flowing aquatic habitats of low to moderate depth.

Symbolism
N. nouchali is the national flower of Bangladesh. A pale blue-flowered N. nouchali is the national flower of Sri Lanka, where it is known as nil mānel or nil mahanel.

In Sri Lanka, this plant usually grows in buffalo ponds and natural wetlands.
Its beautiful aquatic flower has been mentioned in Sanskrit, Pali, and Sinhala literary works since ancient times under the names kuvalaya, indhīwara, niluppala, nilothpala, and nilupul as a symbol of virtue, discipline, and purity. Buddhist lore in Sri Lanka claims that this flower was one of the 108 auspicious signs found on Prince Siddhartha's footprint. It is said that when Buddha died, lotus flowers blossomed everywhere he had walked in his lifetime.

Claire Waight Keller included the plant to represent Bangladesh and Sri Lanka in Meghan Markle's wedding veil, which included the distinctive flora of each Commonwealth country.

N. nouchali might have been one of the plants eaten by the Lotophagi of Homer's Odyssey.

Uses
N. nouchali is used as an ornamental plant because of its spectacular flowers, and is most commonly used for the traditional and cultural  festivals in Sri Lanka. It is also popular as an aquarium plant under the name "dwarf lily" or "dwarf red lily". Sometimes, it is grown for its flowers, while other aquarists prefer to trim the lily pads, and just have the underwater foliage.

N. nouchali is considered a medicinal plant in Indian Ayurvedic medicine under the name ambal; it was mainly used to treat indigestion.

Like all water lilies, its pear-shaped, brown cottony-covered, potato-sized rhizomes, leaves and most of the plant are poisonous, and contain an alkaloid called nupharin. Unlike European species, this can (and must) be neutralised in the rhizomes of this species by boiling. In India these have been eaten as a famine food or as a medicinal. In Vietnam it was eaten roasted. In Sri Lanka it was formerly eaten as a type of medicine and its price was too high to serve as a normal meal, but in the 1940s some villagers began to cultivate the water lilies in the paddy fields left uncultivated during the monsoon season (Yala season), and the price dropped. It is eaten boiled and in curries. The tubers of this species are completely edible, during the dry season they consist almost entirely of starch, and were eaten in West Africa, usually boiled or roasted.

The dried plant is collected from ponds, tanks, and marshes during the dry season and used in India as animal forage.

Heraldry

See also
Nymphaea caerulea, the Egyptian blue lotus or sacred blue lily
Nymphaea lotus, the white lotus or Egyptian white water lily
Nelumbo nucifera, the Indian lotus, sacred lotus
 List of freshwater aquarium plant species

References

External links

Neel kamal (blue waterlily) in Indian culture on Biodiversity of India portal.
 Taxon: Nymphaea stellata Willd. - Synonym of Nymphaea nouchali Burm. f.
Perry D. Slocum: Waterlilies and Lotuses. Timber Press 2005,  (restricted online version at Google Books)
Ambal (Nymphaea stellata) - Flowers of India - Kerala Ayurvedics

Freshwater plants
nouchali
Plants described in 1768
Flora of Africa
Flora of tropical Asia
Flora of Australia
National symbols of Bangladesh
National symbols of Sri Lanka
Taxa named by Nicolaas Laurens Burman